In mathematical finite group theory, a block, sometimes called Aschbacher block, is a subgroup giving an obstruction to Thompson factorization and pushing up. Blocks were introduced by Michael Aschbacher.

Definition

A group L is called short if it has the following properties :
L has no subgroup of index 2
The generalized Fitting subgroup F*(L) is a 2-group O2(L)
The subgroup U = [O2(L), L] is an elementary abelian 2-group in the center of O2(L)
L/O2(L) is quasisimple or of order 3
L acts irreducibly on U/CU(L)

An example of a short group is the semidirect product of a quasisimple group with an irreducible module over the 2-element field F2

A block of a group G is a short subnormal subgroup.

References

Finite groups